Abstract Chintan Pyaj is a 1967 Nepali essay collection by  Shankar Lamichhane. This book won the Madan Puraskar for the year 2024 BS (1967).

Synopsis 
It is an anthologies of essays and in the titular essay, an onion is used as a metaphor in this essay to describe the sequential removal of the layers that conceal a greater something. Our life is a bulb of onion and the different layers are the different stages and incidents of our life.

Reception 
The book won the Madan Puraskar, 2024 BS (1967).

See also 

 Shirishko Phool
 Ghumne Mechmathi Andho Manche

References 

Essays about literature
Madan Puraskar-winning works

Nepalese books
Nepalese non-fiction books
Nepalese non-fiction literature
Nepalese essay collections
1967 essays
Nepali-language books